Wang Fang is a Chinese lightweight rower. She has won medals at World Rowing Championships in 1993 (silver, double sculls), 1994 (bronze, lightweight four), and 1996 (gold, lightweight four).

References

Chinese female rowers
Year of birth missing (living people)
World Rowing Championships medalists for China
Asian Games medalists in rowing
Rowers at the 1994 Asian Games
Asian Games gold medalists for China
Medalists at the 1994 Asian Games
Living people